Shane Cooney (born 1995) is an Irish hurler who plays for Galway Senior Championship club St Thomas's and at inter-county level with the Galway senior hurling team. He is usually deployed as a centre-back. His brother, Conor Cooney, also plays for both teams.

Playing career

St Thomas's

Cooney was just 17-years old when he joined the St Thomas's senior hurling team. On 18 November 2012, he was introduced as a 35th-minute substitute when St Thomas's defeated Loughrea by 3-11 to 2-11 to win the Galway Senior Championship. On 17 March 2013, Cooney was at centre-back when St Thomas's defeated Kilcormac/Killoughey by 1-11 to 1-09 in the All-Ireland final.

On 16 October 2016, Cooney was at centre-back when St Thomas's defeated Gort by 1-11 to 0-10 to win their second ever Galway Senior Championship.

On 18 November 2018, Cooney won a third Galway Senior Championship medal from centre-back after a 2-13 to 0-10 defeat of reigning champions Liam Mellows.

Galway

Minor and under-21

Cooney first played for the Galway minor hurling team on 28 July 2012 in a 4-20 to 2-11 defeat of Wexford in the All-Ireland quarter-final. He was eligible for the minor grade again the following year and, on 8 September 2013, was at centre-back for Galway's 1-21 to 0-16 defeat by Waterford in the All-Ireland final at Croke Park.

On 22 August 2015, Cooney made his first appearance for the Galway under-21 hurling team in a 1-20 to 0-17 defeat by Limerick in the All-Ireland semi-final.

On 10 September 2016, Cooney was at centre-back when Galway suffered a 5-15 to 0-14 defeat by Waterford in the All-Ireland final. It was his last game in the under-21 grade.

Senior

Cooney made his first appearance for the Galway senior hurling team on 3 February 2018 in a 2-18 to 0-17 defeat of Laois in the National Hurling League. On 9 June, he made his first Leinster Championship appearance when he came on as a 50th-minute substitute for Paul Killeen in a 0-26 to 2-19 defeat of Dublin. On 8 July, Cooney was an unused substitute for Galway's 1-28 to 3-15 defeat of Kilkenny in the Leinster final. In the subsequent All-Ireland final against Limerick on 19 August, he was also an unused substitute fr Galway's 3-16 to 2-18 defeat.

Career statistics

Honours

St Thomas's
All-Ireland Senior Club Hurling Championship (1): 2013
Galway Senior Hurling Championship (6): 2012, 2016, 2018, 2019, 2020, 2021

Galway
National Hurling League (1): 2021
Leinster Senior Hurling Championship (1): 2018

References

1995 births
Living people
St Thomas's hurlers
Galway inter-county hurlers